The Silo is a 65-meter (213 foot) apartment building converted from a former grain silo located in Nordhavn, Copenhagen, Denmark. The 17-storey structure was completed in May 2017 and houses 39 apartments, a restaurant and lookout platform. The building was designed by the Copenhagen-based Cobe architectural firm, and was completed in 2017.

Background
The Silo is a part of the transformation of Copenhagen's Nordhaven (meaning North Harbour) from an industrial development into a new city district. Construction required the former grain silo's concrete facade to be upgrading and recladded, the interior of the silo was preserved as much as possible. The apartments housed in The Silo range from 106m² to 401m² in size, with floor heights up to 7 meters, and include floor to ceiling windows and balconies.

The Silo has won numerous design and architectural awards including the Council on Tall Buildings and Urban Habitat 2018 Best Tall Building Europe, the Civic Trust Awards, and the Azure AZ Awards 2018 for design of the multi-storey residential building.

References

External links

Apartment buildings in Copenhagen
Residential buildings completed in 2017
Nordhavn, Copenhagen